George Patrick Smith II is an American academic. Until 2016 he was a professor of law at the Columbus School of Law of The Catholic University of America, of which he is now an emeritus professor.

Education and career 
Smith was born on September 1, 1939, in Wabash, Indiana, where his father and uncle were both attorneys.

He attended the St. Bernard School in Wabash, and graduated from Wabash High School in 1957. He took a B.S. degree in business, economics and public policy from Indiana University Bloomington in 1961 and a Doctor of Jurisprudence degree in 1964; he was a member of the Indiana Law Review.

Indiana University conferred its Silver Medallion upon Smith in 1985 as a Distinguished Service Alumnus,  and in 1998 an LL. D. degree, honoris causa, was conferred upon him.   In 1998, a Distinguished Professorship-Chair was established in Smith’s honor at the Indiana University Maurer School of Law in Bloomington.   The School of Law, again, in 2007, honored Smith by inducting him into the Indiana Academy of Law Fellows –this, in recognition of his professional contributions to the legal profession.

Scholarship 

Judge Richard A. Posner, a member of the United States Court of Appeals for The Seventh Circuit and Lecturer in Law at the University of Chicago Law School, acknowledged Smith as "one of the world’s leading experts on the legal and ethical issues raised by modern medicine" and observed that "he writes with insight and authority, and offers a perspective that will influence policy debates".  Dr. Edmund D. Pellegrino, John Carroll Professor Emeritus of Medicine and Medical Ethics, Georgetown University and former Chairman of the President’s Council on Bioethics, recognized Smith as "an internationally acclaimed scholar and pioneer in cultivating the interdisciplinary study of questions in which law, medical ethics and bioethics intersect." In inaugurating the George P. Smith, II, Distinguished Professorship-Chair of Law at Indiana University in January, 2000, Justice Michael D. Kirby of the High Court of Australia, paid tribute to Smith's "awesome" level of transnational scholarship in Bioethics and his "indefatigable spirit and sense of total commitment as a questioning, inquisitive mind" and proceeded to herald Smith as a "prescient prophet of the New Biology." Later in 2009, Justice Kirby hailed Smith's "commitment to universalism" and "his voracious appetite for wisdom in the exploration of legal and bioethical question... beyond the United States."

On the twenty-fifth anniversary of his career in legal education in 1989, United States Congressman John T. Myers paid tribute to Smith's years of distinguished service to the legal profession. As well, the editors of the Journal of Contemporary Health Law and Policy published his bibliography of scholarship in Law, Science and Medicine. Smith was the founding editor-in-chief of this journal.

In 1988, at the Cathedral of St. John the Divine in New York City, Smith was recognized for his professional contributions to Law and Medical Science by induction to the Most Venerable Order of the Hospital of St. John of Jerusalem.   Similar recognition was given to Smith 1974 by his election to membership in The Cosmos Club in Washington, D.C.   Smith is also a life member of the prestigious American Law Institute.

References

External links 
 George P. Smith's faculty page at the Catholic University of America and Curriculum Vitae

Columbus School of Law faculty
Indiana University Maurer School of Law alumni
1939 births
Living people
People from Wabash, Indiana
Indiana lawyers